Duey may refer to:

People
Duey Stroebel, American Republican politician and businessman from Wisconsin
Henry Duey (1908–1993), American weightlifter and Olympic medalist

Geography
Duey and Julia Wright House, Frank Lloyd Wright designed Usonian home constructed in Wausau, Wisconsin in 1959
Duey River (San Germán, Puerto Rico), river of Puerto Rico
Duey River (Yauco, Puerto Rico), river of Puerto Rico
Duey Alto, San Germán, Puerto Rico, a barrio in Puerto Rico
Duey Bajo, San Germán, Puerto Rico, a barrio in Puerto Rico
Duey, Yauco, Puerto Rico, a barrio in Puerto Rico

See also
Dewey (disambiguation)